Józef Brodowski, (c.1775/81, Warsaw – 1853, Kraków) was a Polish painter in the Classical style. He is called The Elder to distinguish him from Józef Brodowski (1828–1900), who was apparently not related.

Biography
Thanks to the financial support of Princess Izabela Czartoryska, he was able to study in Vienna with Josef Abel and Johann Baptist von Lampi. After 1805, he lived in Łańcut, where he painted portraits and theatrical scenery.

In 1811, he was appointed a drawing teacher. Seven years later, he became one of the first professors at the Kraków Academy of Fine Arts.

He painted historical scenes, genre works, church decorations and portraits. Several of his history paintings involve scenes from the life of Tadeusz Kościuszko. He is noted for portraying the 19th-century Kraków on numerous sketches and prints. He was also an active member of the Przesąd Zwyciężony Masonic Lodge.

See also
List of Polish painters

Sources 
 Feliks Kopera; Polish Biographical Dictionary, Vol.2, Polish Academy of Learning, 1936. Reprint: Ossolineum, Kraków 1989,

References

Further reading
 Stanisława Opalińska, Józef Brodowski: malarz i rysownik starego Krakowa, Muzeum Historyczne Miasta Krakowa, 2005

External links

1772 births
1853 deaths
19th-century Polish painters
19th-century Polish male artists
Polish portrait painters
History painters
Academic staff of the Jan Matejko Academy of Fine Arts
Artists from Warsaw
Polish male painters